Kevin G. Chapman is an author and attorney. His series of novels focuses on Mike Stoneman, an NYPD Detective who grew out of a 2012 short story that Chapman wrote. Righteous Assassin and Deadly Enterprise reached number one on the Amazon best seller list. A follow up title in the series, Lethal Voyage was named 2021's Best Mystery/Thriller by the Kindle Book Review and was a finalist for Chanticleer Book Review’s CLUE Award InD’Tale Magazine’s RONE award.

Chapman was raised in Port Angeles, Washington and graduated from Columbia University with a Bachelor of Arts in English in 1983 and received his JD from Boston University in 1986. After passing the bar he worked for Proskauer Rose, Kauff McClain & McGuire and Dow Jones & Company.

For more than two decades, he has been a resident of New Jersey.

References

External links

Living people
Year of birth missing (living people)
People from Port Angeles, Washington
People from West Windsor, New Jersey
Writers from New Jersey
Columbia College (New York) alumni
Boston University alumni
21st-century American writers